Paracyclopia is a genus of copepods in family Pseudocyclopiidae, containing only the species P. naessi. It is endemic to Bermudan karsts and is critically endangered.

References

Calanoida
Endemic fauna of Bermuda
Taxonomy articles created by Polbot